Lee Moran (born 1943) is a former American football player and coach. He served as the head football coach at Dakota State University in Madison, South Dakota from 1970 to 1972, compiling a record of 18–11. After leaving Dakota State, Moran served as an assistant at New Mexico State University (1973 to 1974) and Kansas State University (1975).

Head coaching record

References

1943 births
Living people
American football guards
Dakota State Trojans football coaches
Kansas State Wildcats football coaches
Morningside Mustangs football players
New Mexico State Aggies football coaches